Boulogne Sur Mer is a town in Buenos Aires Province, Argentina. It is in San Isidro Partido and forms part of the Greater Buenos Aires urban conurbation, 26 km (16,25 mi) north of Buenos Aires. It has a population of 89,046 (2001 INDEC census).  The town is named after the city of Boulogne-sur-Mer in northern France, where the Argentine general José de San Martín died in 1850.

Transport
By rail, the town in served by the narrow gauge Belgrano Norte Line, which has both regular and differential services. National Route 9 also passes through the town, giving direct access to the city of Buenos Aires and to provinces to the west.

Education

Goethe-Schule Buenos Aires, a German school, is in Boulogne.

References

External links
 Boulogne History

Populated places in Buenos Aires Province
San Isidro Partido
Cities in Argentina